Banyuls is a French appellation d'origine contrôlée (AOC) for a fortified apéritif or dessert wine made from old vines cultivated in terraces on the slopes of the Catalan Pyrenees in the Roussillon county of France, bordering, to the south, the Empordà wine region in Catalonia in Spain.

The AOC production area is limited to four communes of the Côte Vermeille: Banyuls (from which the AOC takes its name), Cerbère, Collioure and Port-Vendres. The boundaries of the AOC are identical to those of the  Collioure AOC.

Banyuls Grand Cru is an AOC for superior wines that would otherwise be classified as simply Banyuls. They must be matured for 30 months. The grapes permitted are the same.

Winemaking

The production process, known in France as mutage, is similar to that used to make Port. Alcohol is added to the must to halt fermentation while sugar levels are still high, preserving the natural sweetness of the grape. The wines are then matured in oak barrels, or outside in glass bottles exposed to the sun, allowing the wine to maderise. The maturation period is a minimum of ten months for Banyuls AOC. The resulting wine bears a similarity to port but tends to be lower in alcohol (≈16% vs. ≈20%).

Grapes and wines
Most wines are red, although some white and rosé wines are produced. Permitted grape varieties are Grenache noir (at least 50%, 75% for the Grand Cru), Grenache gris, Grenache blanc and Carignan, and also (but rarely used) Macabeu, Muscat and Malvoisie.

Producers
Producers of note in Banyuls making traditional Banyuls wines include Domaine de la Rectorie, Domaine Vial-Magneres, Domaine du Traginer, Domaine Madeloc, and Domaine du Mas Blanc.

See also
List of Appellation d'Origine Contrôlée wines
List of appellations in Languedoc-Roussillon

References

Languedoc-Roussillon wine AOCs
Roussillon wine AOCs
Fortified wine
Banyuls-sur-Mer